La usurpadora (English: The Usurper) is a Mexican television series produced by Carmen Armendáriz for Televisa. It is a reboot based on the 1998 Mexican telenovela of the same name and the first series of the anthology series Fábrica de sueños. In the series, the character Paola Miranda, the First Lady of Mexico, discovers she has a twin sister and tries to swap lives with her.

The show began filming on 25 April 2019, with the first five episodes given a special pre-release online on 30 August 2019. The series then ran from 2 September to 4 October 2019, on Las Estrellas. The first and only season consisted of 25 episodes.

Plot 
Paola Miranda, the First Lady of Mexico, is in an unhappy marriage to Carlos, the President. At the outset of the show, she discovers that she is adopted and has a twin sister; though she resents the twin she believes made their mother disown her, Paola sees an opportunity to escape her life, and seeks her out. Paola plots to pull a Prince and the Pauper switch with her newfound twin, Paulina Doria, to stand in as First Lady on Independence Day, and then kill her. With her identity (and the twin she despises) dead, Paola could run away with her lover Gonzalo.

Paulina is based in the capital of Colombia, Bogotá, running an orphanage and tending to her aging mother, Olga. She is mysteriously offered large donations from a Mexican benefactor to trick her into traveling there. She is kidnapped by Paola, who threatens to murder Olga to blackmail Paulina into assuming her identity for two weeks. Paulina accepts the role and becomes the "usurpadora", moving into Los Pinos, the presidential palace.

During the Independence celebrations, Paulina is shot. However, not only does she live, but the National Intelligence Center opens an investigation into the shooting, thinking that the President was the real target. The President himself also hires a private detective, the former agent Facundo Nava, to investigate. Paola has already run away with Gonzalo to Bora Bora; she is still not satisfied and kills him there, returning to Mexico City to cover her tracks.

Meanwhile, Paulina takes to her new role, finding her new public standing the perfect opportunity to engage in social activism. Paola is unimpressed with the total usurpation of her life by the twin she hates, and tries to kill her again using a friend of Gonzalo's, Manuel, who has professed he would kill for her. Facundo is almost hit in the attempt, and begins working directly with Paulina to find the new attacker. Paulina returns to Colombia to make sure that her mother is still alive, trusting Facundo to find out everything. Paola tries to return to her role and, since the two weeks are over, asks for Paulina to give up the life she has grown to love.

Paulina is not willing to sacrifice her position of social influence for charity and begins her own scheme: acting crazy to get committed, and using the real story to receive a diagnosis of multiple personality disorder. Paola tries once more to kill her, but instead is mistakenly attacked by Manuel's sister, Teresa, who was supposed to be helping her. Facundo breaks Paulina out of the hospital and takes her to the countryside; Paola is taken to Colombia after being misidentified as her sister after the attack, with her confusion ruled as post-traumatic stress.

Olga realizes who Paola really is at the same time that Paulina is returned to Los Pinos by Facundo saying she is cured. Paulina convinces Carlos that she isn't crazy and has him travel to Colombia with her to meet Olga. Paola, Paulina, and Olga come to an agreement whereby the twins will continue swapping lives for a little longer, so that Olga has some time to get to know Paola. Only a few days later, though, she dies, with Paola determinedly returning to Mexico.

Cast and characters 

Part of the cast was revealed by the Las Estrellas website on 25 April 2019.

The episodes of the show do not feature a title sequence; subsequently, in each episode the entire cast minus stars Sandra Echeverría and Arap Bethke are credited. In episode one, Echeverría and Bethke are also credited.

The three main actors are Echeverría, who plays both Paola Miranda de Bernal, the First Lady, and her twin sister Paulina Doria; Bethke, who plays the former police commander Facundo Nava; and Andrés Palacios, who plays Carlos Bernal, the President of Mexico.

Announced later, the secondary cast features several of the relatives of the main characters: Daniela Schmidt plays Gema Vidal, the assistant and lover of Bernal; Juan Carlos Barreto plays Manuel Hernández, who is in love with Paola, with Aurora Gil as Manuel's crazy sister, Teresa. Queta Lavat was added as Piedad Mejía, Bernal's mother.

The remaining cast were revealed when the show went to air:

 Ana Bertha Espín as Arcadia Rivas de Miranda, Paola's adopted mother
 Macarena Oz as Lisette Bernal, Carlos and Paola's daughter
 Germán Bracco as Emilio Bernal, Carlos' son
 Verónica Terán as Juana, the housekeeper of the presidential house
 Montserrat Marañón as Monse, Paulina's nurse and assistant
 Josh Gutiérrez as Molina, the de facto head of security at the presidential house
 Victoria Hernández as Olga Doria, the biological mother of Paulina and Paola
 Nadia Rowinsky as Paulina, Paola son
 Lion Bagnis as Diego, Lisette's boyfriend
 Paco Rueda as Pedro, Facundo's assistant
 Emilio Guerrero as Pascual, the official head of the First Family's security
 Ricardo Leguizamo as Wilson, Paulina's ex-boyfriend in Colombia
 Emiro Balocco as Dr. Restrepo, the doctor who was hired on Paola's behalf to kill her mother
 Gabriela Zamora as Irene, Facundo's lover
 Pierre Louis as Osvaldo, Pedro's boyfriend
 Juan Martín Jáuregui as Gonzalo Santamaría, Paola's lover

Production

Development 
The series was inspired by a story from Cuban telewriter Inés Rodena and largely based on the 1998 version, La usurpadora.

Claimed as a major difference compared to the 1998 show, the producers insisted on using the modern American format of 25 episodes that are produced in one block; despite this oddity in terms of Mexican productions, Carmen Armendáriz said the series "would not lose its telenovela essence". The creative team also wanted to update the story's context, too, changing the businessman and trophy wife leads to the President and First Lady; including settings in other countries (primarily Colombia) to show an international Mexico; and changing the two sons of the leads in the original into a son and daughter, who are also step-siblings.

Casting 
On 9 April 2019, People en Español magazine confirmed that Sandra Echeverría would be the new protagonist of the remake. Echeverría said that to play Paulina she took a workshop where she learnt how to speak in a Colombian accent; a reviewer found that the accent improved through the show. Carolina Cano was hired shortly after Echeverría to act as the stand-in for the twins in scenes where they are both present; these scenes were described as Echeverría to be the hardest, not because she had to film them twice, but because any movement in the scene had to be recreated perfectly by both her and Cano. In scenes where both twins' faces can be seen, the production used motion capture. The director of photography, Abraham Reyes Pérez, said that not only does Cano looks very similar to Echeverría, but she also acts in a similar way and quickly learnt the processes of character doubling.

Filming 

A lot of the story takes place in the presidential palace, Los Pinos. Ernesto Esteva, in the art department of the production, said that the house was based on European styles, and more specifically on "what was brought from the old continent to New Spain". It was built on a sound stage at Televisa, because there were no locations in Mexico City that matched the image the production was trying to achieve. However, Esteva says that there were old buildings in other regions, including Puebla, Tlaxcala and Hidalgo, on which certain parts of the building were based. The palace in the series is not modeled on the real Los Pinos in terms of design and architecture, but Esteva says that the scope of the buildings are similar, so that the events of the show could realistically be happening within the appropriate spaces. The network says that 30 people worked around the clock, and built the functioning palace set in five weeks at a cost of 8.5 million pesos, 4 million of which went on creating the facade.

The early scenes in Bora Bora was filmed at the Playa del Carmen in Cancún, with the production only sending a small crew and the two relevant actors, Echeverría and Jáuregui. Shooting also took place on the Riviera Maya, featuring the presidential suite of the Mayakoba Hotel.

Reception

Critical response 

The website La hora de la Novela gave a positive review of the first episodes, commending the special effects and choice of locations. However, the "visual look" of the show was criticized, with the reviewer suggesting that the production has made the show "cold in blue and gray tones" to make it look serious, and that this is especially jarring with the scenes set in Bora Bora, where one would expect warm and striking tones to show the tropical destination. The ending theme, a ballad, was also described as not fitting the tone of the show. Overall, the website wrote that the first week of the remake left a "good taste in the mouth", saying that it had a high production quality; lighting that got better with each episode; good structure and non-invasive music; and producers and writers that are talented at adaptation, keeping the story intact but also modernizing it well.

Giving a negative review, Álvaro Cueva of Milenio said that though the production tried to make the show into a series, it was still very much a telenovela, and noted that it came to Mexican television at a bad time, relating it to the first report on the Andrés Manuel López Obrador presidency. Cueva said that the show was too morbid and that its creators must have "serious mental issues"; he also criticized that the first episode details a plot to assassinate the First Lady during Independence Day, and so could be giving ideas to radicals who would really try such a thing. Unlike La hora de la Novela's warm view of the production's recreation of the show, Cueva referred to it derogatorily as "refrito", saying it was a mockery to the Mexican audience; he explained that the original was a focused show that knew its audience, and opined that the new production lacked this, saying that the writers haven't even modernized it because they were off-the-mark with what a modern woman in Mexico wants, which is not, in Cueva's view, something as simple as being First Lady.

Abraham Reyes of the La Neta Noticias website commented that the production never managed to obtain the same rating level that episode 1 had during its broadcast. According to Reyes, the final episode of the series was described as "bland, flat and boring", since it offered nothing new with respect to its previous version. Since its end on 4 October 2019, several followers of the production claimed to prefer the 1998 version, than the 2019 version.

For its part, with respect to the end of the series, the website La Hora de la Novela gave positive reviews, praising Carmen Armendáriz's production as one of the best in 2019. But she also criticized the abrupt end that was given to the series with Andrés Palacios and Sandra Echeverría staying together as a family, and leaving Betke out. In addition to giving good reviews regarding the protagonists, the work of the actors Juan Carlos Barreto, Aurora Gil, Ana Bertha Espín, Queta Lavat and Paco Ruedas was also praised.

Popular response 
The Venezuelan actress Gabriela Spanic, who starred in the 1998 version, lauded the series, commending the quality and praising Echeverría, saying that she loves it and that Echeverría is "an excellent actress of the new generation. I really like her work [...] she is doing great. I am very happy that I can say I love the success this is having".

Other versions 
Rodena's 1998 telenovela, the basis for the show, was itself based on Daphne du Maurier's 1957 The Scapegoat, and took inspiration from several previous Latin American versions, particularly a 1971 Venezuelan telenovela of the story. In 1981, Valentín Pimstein made the first Mexican version of Rodena's novel, called El hogar que yo robé, with Venezuela creating another version, called La intrusa, in 1986. Though the 1998 version was the most popular during its run and is said to be not only the best version, but one of the most popular of all telenovelas, another remake had been made in 2012, ¿Quién eres tú? co-produced by Mexico with Colombia and the United States.

Analysis 
The character of Carlos Bernal, the President of Mexico played by Andrés Palacios, has been compared by La Hora de la Novela to have similarities with figures like the Nuevo León governor Jaime Rodríguez Calderón and former president Enrique Peña Nieto, who also, like Bernal, had children out of wedlock.

Episodes 

The title of each episode refers to a phrase mentioned by a character in it.

Notes

Ratings

Mexico ratings 
 
}}

U.S. ratings 
  
}}

Awards and nominations

References

External links
 

2019 Mexican television series debuts
Mexican drama television series
Television series by Televisa
Spanish-language television shows
Mexican LGBT-related television shows
Television shows set in Mexico City
Television shows set in Bogotá
Cultural depictions of women
Television series about dysfunctional families
2019 Mexican television series endings
Gay-related television shows
Serial drama television series
Television series reboots
Mass media portrayals of the upper class
2010s LGBT-related drama television series
Television series about twins